Eva or Eve is a 1953 Greek drama film directed by Maria Plyta and starring Manos Katrakis, Dinos Iliopoulos and Nina Sgouridou.

Cast
 Manos Katrakis as Alekos  
 Dinos Iliopoulos as Nasos  
 Nina Sgouridou as Eva  
 Aliki Georgouli as Anny  
 Alekos Alexandrakis as Antinoos 
 Fragoulis Fragoulis 
 Ilias Iakovou 
 Alekos Leventis 
 Takis Mihalopoulos 
 Eleni Panagiotopoulou 
 Thanos Papadopoulos 
 Dionysia Roi 
 Smaro Veaki 
 Nana Viopoulou 
 Dimitris Vlahopoulos

References

Bibliography
 Vrasidas Karalis. A History of Greek Cinema. A&C Black, 2012.

External links
 

1953 films
1953 drama films
1950s Greek-language films
Greek drama films
Films directed by Maria Plyta
Greek black-and-white films